Chamberino is an unincorporated community and census-designated place (CDP) in Doña Ana County, New Mexico, United States. As of the 2010 census it had a population of 919. A post office was established at Chamberino in 1880; although it was suppressed two years later, it was reëstablished in 1893 and continues to the present day. The ZIP code is 88027.

Demographics

Notable person
J. Paul Taylor, New Mexico legislator and educator, was born in Chamberino.

References

Census-designated places in Doña Ana County, New Mexico
Census-designated places in New Mexico